Carissa's Wierd was an American indie rock band based in Seattle that formed in 1995 and disbanded in late 2003. Their sound has been described as "chamber rock". The band deliberately misspelled the word "Weird" in their name.

History

Carissa's Wierd was formed in Tucson, Arizona in 1995 by Brooke and Champion when they were teenagers, practicing on rudimentary cheap guitars and amplifiers. Originally sharing bills with hardcore bands in the Tucson scene, Carissa's Wierd made a name for themselves and the pair toured behind Modest Mouse, using fake IDs to gain their ways into clubs and riding in U-Hauls. As the band grew, Brooke and Champion found themselves filling out the band with Sera Cahoone and Ben Bridwell, plus a rotating cast of other musicians. Relocating to the Pacific Northwest, the band's debut album, Ugly But Honest, was released in 1999 on Bridwell's own label, Brown Records. The band was later signed to Sad Robot Records.

The band played their final shows at the Crocodile Cafe in Seattle in November 2003.

Following the band's breakup, Jenn Champion and Sera Cahoone started solo projects, Champion's under the name "S." Mat Brooke and Ben Bridwell formed Band of Horses, which Brooke later left to form the band Grand Archives.

On July 13, 2010, Hardly Art released a "best of" compilation titled They'll Only Miss You When You Leave: Songs 1996-2003. The release was preceded by a one-off reunion show on July 9, 2010 at Seattle's Showbox at the Market, which featured Brooke, Champion, Cahoone, Robin Peringer, Sarah Standard and Jeff Hellis.

In July 2010, Brooke revealed that he and Champion had recently bought back all rights to Carissa's Wierd's back catalogue, which was previously owned by Sad Robot Records. He said, "Me and Jenn have been working for a while to buy back the rights to all of our records and we finally were able to get them all back." This should allow all of Carissa's Wierd's albums to be re-released soon.

In July 2011, Mat Brooke told The Air-Raid Podcast, in an episode entitled "History Repeats Itself With Grand Archives," that another reunion show was scheduled at Neumos in Seattle on September 24. Brooke said that the band may play the Ugly But Honest album in its entirety, with the original band line-up. In August 2011, a new single, "Tucson" was released and that was followed, on October 10, by another concert at New York University.

In July 2019, Brooke and Champion announced a string of Ugly But Honest 20th anniversary shows billed under "Mat Brooke and Jenn Champion of Carissa's Wierd." The shows occurred that November, in Los Angeles, San Francisco, and Seattle. A fourth show, scheduled for New York, was later announced for March 2020; it was subsequently cancelled due to the COVID-19 pandemic.

Discography

Albums
 Ugly But Honest: 1996-1999 - Brown Records (1999)
 You Should Be at Home Here - Brown Records (June 2001)
 Songs About Leaving - Sad Robot Records (2002)
 I Before E (Live album with three studio tracks) - Sad Robot Records (2004)

Compilations
 Scrapbook (2003; reissue on Hardly Art, 2010)
 They'll Only Miss You When You Leave: Songs 1996-2003 - Hardly Art (2010)

Singles
 "You Should Be Hated Here" 7" - Sub Pop Records (2001)
 "Tucson" b/w "Meredith & Iris" 7" - Hardly Art (2011)

Appearances on compilation albums
Home Alive Compilation, Volume 2: Flying Side Kick - Broken Rekids (2001)
Keepsake, Volume 1 - Keep Recordings (2004)

Notes

External links
 Carissa's Wierd page at Hardly Art records
 Band of Horses
 Sera Cahoone
 Grand Archives

Indie rock musical groups from Washington (state)
Musical groups from Seattle
1995 establishments in Washington (state)
Musical groups established in 1995